The 2015 Korea Open was a women's  professional tennis tournament played on hard courts. It was the 12th edition of the tournament, and part of the 2015 WTA Tour. It took place in Seoul, South Korea between 21 and 27 September 2015.

Points and prize money

Point distribution

Prize money

1 Qualifiers prize money is also the Round of 32 prize money
* per team

Singles main-draw entrants

Seeds 

 1 Rankings are as of September 14, 2015

Other entrants 

The following players received wildcards into the singles main draw:
  Kimiko Date-Krumm 
  Han Na-lae 
  Jang Su-jeong

The following players received entry from the qualifying draw:
  Paula Badosa Gibert   
  Kateryna Kozlova 
  Nicole Melichar 
  Aliaksandra Sasnovich

Withdrawals 
Before the tournament
  Alizé Cornet → replaced by  Lauren Davis
  Casey Dellacqua → replaced by  Elizaveta Kulichkova
  Karin Knapp → replaced by  Mariana Duque Mariño
  Bethanie Mattek-Sands → replaced by  Yaroslava Shvedova
  Roberta Vinci → replaced by  Irina Falconi

Retirements
  Klára Koukalová
  Yaroslava Shvedova

Doubles main-draw entrants

Seeds 

1 Rankings are as of September 14, 2015

Other entrants 

The following players received wildcards into the singles main draw:
  Choi Ji-hee /  Lee So-ra
  Han Sung-hee /  Hong Seung-yeon

Finals

Singles 

 Irina-Camelia Begu defeated  Aliaksandra Sasnovich, 6–3, 6–1

Doubles 

 Lara Arruabarrena /  Andreja Klepač defeated  Kiki Bertens /  Johanna Larsson, 2–6, 6–3, [10–6]

References

External links 
 

Korea Open
Korea Open
Korea Open (tennis)
September 2015 sports events in South Korea